Musina is a town in South Africa.

Musina may also refer to:

Places
Musina Local Municipality , South Africa
Musina, Bulgaria, a village
Musina Glacier, Antarctica

People
Alexandru Muşina Romanian poet, essayist, and editor
Luigi Musina, Italian boxer
Musina, the feminine form of the Russian surname Musin

See also

Mussina